The red-breasted wrasse (Cheilinus fasciatus) is a species of wrasse native to the Indian Ocean and the western Pacific Ocean.

Description
Its head is greenish-blue, followed by a distinctive red-orange band followed by black and white stripes. Terminal phase fishes generally have a more pronounced red band and convex forehead than initial phase and juvenile fish.

Distribution
The red-breasted wrasse is native to the tropical waters of the Indo-Pacific region from the Red Sea and the African coast to the islands of the western Pacific.

Habitat and diet
The red-breasted wrasse lives in lagoons and seaward reefs in areas mixing rubble, coral, and sand at depths of from  though rarer below .

It feeds mainly on crustaceans, sea urchins, hard-shelled invertebrates, and mollusks.

References

External links
 http://www.marinespecies.org/aphia.php?p=taxdetails&id=218940
 http://eol.org/pages/223458/details
 

Red-breasted wrasse
Fish described in 1791
Taxa named by Marcus Elieser Bloch